Craig Phillip Chamberlain (born February 2, 1957) is an American former professional baseball player. As a rookie with the 1979 Royals, Chamberlain threw three complete game victories in his first three Major League appearances.

Chamberlain was drafted in the first round of the secondary phase of the 1978 Major League Baseball draft after attending Long Beach City College and the University of Arizona.  The ,  right-hander made his professional debut in 1979 at the Double-A level and won 12 of 21 decisions, with 11 complete games and a sparkling 2.59 earned run average.  In August 1979, the Royals summoned him to the Major Leagues and he made his first start on August 12.

Three straight complete game wins kicked off MLB career
The Royals were then locked in a race for the American League West Division championship, in third place and five games behind the California Angels.  In a game against the Detroit Tigers at Royals Stadium, Whitey Herzog, the Kansas City manager, handed the ball to the 22-year-old Chamberlain and gave him the starting assignment in his MLB debut.  Chamberlain proceeded to allow only six hits, five of them singles, in a 7–1 triumph, walking two and striking out six.

Five days later, at Memorial Stadium in Baltimore against the Orioles, Chamberlain again got the starting nod and again notched a complete game, 7–1 win.  This time, he allowed only three hits (including a home run by Ken Singleton) and two walks to the eventual American League champions, defeating Baseball Hall of Fame pitcher Jim Palmer.

In his third start, on August 24 at home against the Boston Red Sox, Chamberlain was not as effective, allowing ten hits and two earned runs, but he defeated Boston 4–2 and, in the process, bested another future Hall of Famer, Dennis Eckersley, who was then a starting pitcher.

Starting pitcher during Royals' 1979 stretch run
His winning streak ended four days later, on August 28 against the visiting Milwaukee Brewers. He went only five innings, allowing seven hits (including two home runs) and four earned runs, and took the loss in an 11–6 Milwaukee victory.

After a no-decision in his fifth start, against New York at Yankee Stadium, Chamberlain notched his fourth complete game win in his sixth start September 7 at the Kingdome in an eight-hit, 6–2 win over the Seattle Mariners.  It would be his last MLB victory and complete game.

Chamberlain continued to take a turn in the Kansas City rotation during September 1979 but lost his last three decisions, to finish 4–4 with a 3.75 earned run average in ten starts and 69 innings pitched during his rookie campaign.  The Royals finished three games behind the Angels in second place in the AL West.

In 1980, the Royals would break through to recapture the division title and win their first American League pennant, but Chamberlain spent the season at Triple-A, winning 11 games but compiling an ineffective 4.76 earned run average with the Omaha Royals.  He was recalled in September and made five appearances in relief, but lost his only decision and allowed ten hits and five walks in 9 innings pitched. It was his last MLB trial.  His professional career, however, continued over the next 15 seasons, in the minor leagues (1981–1983; 1987–1988; 1991) and independent league baseball (1995).

As a Major Leaguer, he pitched in 15 games and 79 innings, allowing 78 hits and 23 walks, with 33 strikeouts.

External links

Pura Pelota

1957 births
Living people
Arizona Wildcats baseball players
Baseball players from California
Canton-Akron Indians players
Charlotte Knights players
Colorado Springs Sky Sox players
Jacksonville Suns players
Kansas City Royals players
Long Beach Barracudas players
Major League Baseball pitchers
Omaha Royals players
Phoenix Giants players
People from Hollywood, Los Angeles
San Bernardino Spirit players
Shreveport Captains players
Tigres de Aragua players
American expatriate baseball players in Venezuela
Long Beach City Vikings baseball players